The 2019 Generali Open Kitzbühel was a tennis tournament played on outdoor clay courts. It was the 75th edition of the Austrian Open Kitzbühel, and part of the ATP Tour 250 series of the 2019 ATP Tour. It took place at the Tennis stadium Kitzbühel in Kitzbühel, Austria, from July 29 through August 4.

Singles main draw entrants

Seeds

 1 Rankings are as of July 22, 2019

Other entrants
The following players received wildcards into the singles main draw:
  Dennis Novak
  Sebastian Ofner
  Jurij Rodionov

The following player received entry using a protected ranking into the singles main draw: 
  Jozef Kovalík

The following players received entry as special exempt:
  Thomas Fabbiano
  Albert Ramos Viñolas

The following players received entry from the qualifying draw:
  Matthias Bachinger
  Hugo Dellien
  Guillermo García López
  Lucas Miedler

Withdrawals
  Filip Krajinović → replaced by  Jaume Munar
  João Sousa → replaced by  Jozef Kovalík

Doubles main draw entrants

Seeds

 Rankings are as of July 22, 2019

Other entrants
The following pairs received wildcards into the doubles main draw:
  Nicolás Massú /  Moritz Thiem
  Lucas Miedler /  Sebastian Ofner
The following pair received entry using a protected ranking into the doubles main draw: 
  Martin Kližan /  Nenad Zimonjić

Finals

Singles

  Dominic Thiem defeated  Albert Ramos Viñolas, 7–6(7–0), 6–1

Doubles

  Philipp Oswald /  Filip Polášek defeated  Sander Gillé /  Joran Vliegen, 6–4, 6–4

References

External links
Official website 

Generali Open Kitzbuhel
Austrian Open Kitzbühel
Austrian Open
Generali Open Kitzbühel
Generali Open Kitzbühel